Avilius (foaled 22 May 2014) is a retired British bred thoroughbred racehorse that won multiple Group 1 races in Australia.

Background
Avilius is a son of Pivotal and was bred at Darley Stud.

Racing career
Originally trained by André Fabre in France, Avilius won a 2400m maiden at Chantilly and the Listed Prix de Suresnes at Maisons-Laffitte.  Avilius also had placings in the Prix Eugène Adam and the Prix Guillaume d'Ornano.

Avilius was then transferred to Godolphin's Australian stable of James Cummings where he was gelded.  Avilius has won 9 races in Australia, including the Ranvet Stakes, Tancred Stakes and the George Main Stakes which are at Group 1 level.

It was announced in July 2021 that Avilius would be retired from racing and become part of the Godolphin Lifetime Care program, where he would be retrained, most likely as a show horse.

Pedigree

References 
 

2014 racehorse births
Racehorses bred in the United Kingdom
Racehorses trained in Australia